Breck Shampoo is an American brand of shampoo that is also known for its Breck Girls advertising campaign.

History

In 1930, Dr. John H. Breck, Sr. (June 5, 1877 – February 1965) of Springfield, Massachusetts, founded Breck Shampoo. Advertising that "every woman is different," by the 1950s, the shampoo was available in three expressions, color-coded for easy identity:
 D (red label) "For Dry Hair"
 O (yellow label) "For Oily Hair"
 N (blue label) "For Normal Hair"

In 1963, Breck was sold to Shulton Division of American Cyanamid, a chemical company based in New Jersey. 

Breck was sold to The Dial Corporation in 1990. In 2001, Dial licensed Breck to The Himmel Group and in 2006 it was licensed to Dollar Tree. 

The Dial Corporation (now Henkel North American Consumer Goods) continues to market Breck shampoo in the institutional market.

Breck Girls

In 1936, son Edward J. Breck (1907–1993) assumed management of Breck Shampoo and hired commercial artist Charles Gates Sheldon (1889 – 1961) to draw women for their advertisements. Sheldon's early portraits for Breck were done in pastels, with a soft focus and halos of light and color surrounding them. He created romantic images of feminine beauty and purity. He preferred to draw "real women" as opposed to professional models.

In 1957 Ralph William Williams succeeded Sheldon as the Breck artist. Unlike Sheldon, he often used professional women. Breck advertisements ran regularly in magazines such as Ladies Home Journal, Woman's Home Companion, Seventeen, Vogue, Glamour, and Harper's Bazaar. They were most often on the back cover of the magazine. During these years, Breck Girls were identified through the company's sponsorship of America's Junior Miss contests. After Williams' death in 1976, the advertising tradition stopped. It was relaunched in 1987 with portrait artist Robert Anderson. Celia Gouge from Atlanta was chosen as the 1987 Breck Girl. Joanne DeLavan O'Donnell, also from Atlanta, was chosen as the 1988 Breck Girl. In 1988, the then owner of the brand changed the name of the campaign spokesperson to The Breck Woman. 

The Breck Girls ads are archived in the advertising history records in the Smithsonian National Museum of American History.

 1937 Roma Whitney Armstrong at age 17, first Breck Girl 
 1937 Anya Taranda (1915–1970)
 1937 Alice Anderson  (1917–?)
 1948 Marylin Skelton
 1962 Marie T. Kelly Hynes
 1963 Ginny Guild
 1965 Patti Boyd
 1968 Cheryl Tiegs
 1968 Cybill Shepherd
 1971, 1973 Jaclyn Smith
 1972, 1974 Kim Basinger
 1974 Brooke Shields
 1975 Farrah Fawcett
 1976 Erin Gray
 1978 Michelle Robin 
 1981 Christie Brinkley
 1987 Cecilia Gouge (bringing back the Breck girl after a hiatus with a non-model career woman)
  1988 Joanne DeLavan O'Donnell

References 

 Breck Girls Collection c1936-1995 by Mimi Minnick, Archives Center, National Museum of American History
 Charles Sheldon Grapefruit Moon Gallery
 Charles Shelton American Art Archives
 Goodrum, Charles & Helen Dalrymple, Advertising in America: the First 200 Years, New York, Harry N. Abrams, Inc., 1990, first ed.

Companies based in Springfield, Massachusetts
Henkel brands
Shampoo brands
Products introduced in 1930